The 152 mm /53 Model 1926–1929 were built for the Italian Navy in the years before World War II. These guns were used on all Condottieri-class light cruisers except the Duca degli Abruzzi-class.

Construction
The Model 1926 was designed and manufactured by Ansaldo, while the Model 1929 was manufactured by OTO Melara. Although both models of gun were similar in construction, components from each manufacturer were not fully interchangeable.

The gun mounts had electrically powered training, elevation, hoists, rammers and the guns shared a common cradle. Improvements in ammunition handling meant that the rate of fire for the Model 1929 was nearly twice as fast as the Model 1926. Loading was at +20° for the Model 1926, while the model 1929 could be loaded at any angle up to 45°. The main reason for the dispersion problem was because the guns were mounted too close together on a common cradle, which also complicated loading of the guns.

Naval Service
The majority of the Condottieri-classes had two superfiring twin-mount turrets forward and aft, except for the Duca degli Abruzzi-class which had different model guns and had two twin-turrets replaced with two triple-turrets. The Giussano-class carried Model 1926 guns, while the Cadorna-class, Montecuccoli-class and Duca d'Aosta-class carried Model 1929 guns. The mountings for the Giussano-class and Cadorna-class were found to be too lightly built for the recoil forces created by these guns.

Ammunition 
Ammunition was of quick fire separate loading type.

The gun was able to fire:
 Armor Piercing (early) - 
 Armor Piercing (late) - 
 High Explosive -

Photo gallery
Surviving examples of Model 1929 guns salvaged from the Cruiser Raimondo Montecuccoli are located at the Città della Domenica theme and amusement park near Perugia, in Italy.

See also

Weapons of comparable role, performance and era
 BL 6 inch Mk XXII naval gun approximate British equivalent deployed on battleships
 6"/53 caliber gun US equivalent

Notes

References
 
 

152 mm artillery
World War II naval weapons
World War II artillery of Italy
Naval guns of Italy